On the night of Monday, 1 July 2002, BAL Bashkirian Airlines Flight 2937, a Tupolev Tu-154 passenger jet, and DHL International Aviation ME Flight 611, a Boeing 757 cargo jet, collided in midair over Überlingen, a southern German town on Lake Constance, near the Swiss border. All of the passengers and crew aboard both planes were killed, resulting in a total death toll of 71.

The official investigation by the German Federal Bureau of Aircraft Accident Investigation (BFU) identified the main cause of the collision to be a number of shortcomings on the part of the Swiss air traffic controller (ATC) service in charge of the sector involved, as well as ambiguities in the procedures regarding the use of the traffic collision avoidance system (TCAS) on board.

A year and a half after the crash, on Tuesday, 24 February 2004, Peter Nielsen, the air traffic controller on duty at the time of the collision, was murdered in an apparent act of revenge by Vitaly Kaloyev, a Russian citizen whose wife and two children had been killed in the accident.

Aircraft involved 
Flight BTC2937 was a chartered flight from Moscow, Russia, to Barcelona, Spain, carrying 60 passengers and nine crew. Forty-six of the passengers were Russian schoolchildren from the city of Ufa, in Bashkortostan, on a school trip organised by the local UNESCO committee to the Costa Daurada beach area of Catalonia. Most of the parents of the children were high-ranking officials in Bashkortostan. One of the fathers was the head of the local UNESCO committee. They traveled on an overnight train to Moscow and arrived on 29 June, then, as their driver accidentally took them to the wrong airport, they missed their original flight. They remained there until 1 July in order to find the arranged charter flight. Flight 2937 departed at Moscow Domodedovo Airport at 22:48 Moscow Time (18:48 UTC) bound for Barcelona International Airport (now Josep Tarradellas Barcelona–El Prat Airport).

The aircraft was once again sold to Shaheen Air in 1999 before being returned to BAL Bashkirian Airlines in January 2002. The flight was piloted by an experienced Russian crew: 52-year-old Captain Alexander Mikhailovich Gross and 40-year-old First Officer Oleg Pavlovich Grigoriev. The captain had more than 12,000 flight hours (including 4,918 hours on the Tu-154) to his credit. Grigoriev, the chief pilot of Bashkirian Airlines, had 8,500 hours of flying experience (with 4,317 hours on the Tu-154) and his task was to evaluate Captain Gross's performance throughout the flight.

Forty-one-year-old Murat Akhatovich Itkulov, a seasoned pilot with close to 7,900 flight hours (with 4,181 of them on the Tu-154), who was normally the first officer, did not officially serve on duty, because this was the captain's assessment flight; 50-year-old Sergei Gennadyevich Kharlov, a flight navigator with approximately 13,000 flight hours (including 6,421 hours on the Tu-154), and 37-year-old Flight Engineer Oleg Irikovich Valeev, who had almost 4,200 flight hours (all of which were on the Tu-154), joined the three pilots in the cockpit.

It was then sold to SNAS Aviation in 1996 under the same registration. The flight was being flown by two Bahrain-based pilots, 47-year-old British Captain Paul Phillips and 34-year-old Canadian First Officer Brant Campioni. Both pilots were very experienced — Phillips had logged close to 12,000 flight hours (including 4,145 hours on the Boeing 757) and Campioni had accumulated more than 6,600 flight hours, with 176 of them on the Boeing 757. At the time of the accident, the aircraft was en route from Bahrain International Airport in Manama, Bahrain, to Brussels Airport in Brussels, Belgium, with a stop at Orio al Serio Airport in Bergamo, Italy, and departed Bergamo at 23:06 CEST (21:06 UTC).

Accident

The airspace was controlled from Zürich, Switzerland, by the Swiss federal airspace control Skyguide.  Air traffic controller Peter Nielsen, the only controller handling the airspace, was working two workstations at the same time.

At around 23:20 CEST (21:20 UTC), DHL Flight 611 reported to the area control center responsible for southern German airspace. Nielsen then instructed Flight 611 to climb from flight level 260 to flight level 320. Flight 611 requested permission to continue the climb to flight level 360 to save fuel. Permission was granted by Nielsen, after which Flight 611 reached the desired altitude at 23:29:50. Meanwhile, Bashkirian Flight 2937 contacted Nielsen at 23:30, also at flight level 360.  Nielsen acknowledged the flight, but did not assign a different altitude to either aircraft.  This meant that both were now at the same altitude and on conflicting courses.

At 23:34:42 CEST (21:34:42 UTC), less than a minute before the crash, Nielsen realized the danger and contacted Flight 2937, instructing the pilot to descend to flight level 350 (1000 ft lower) to avoid collision with crossing traffic (Flight 611). Seconds after the crew of Flight 2937 initiated this descent, their TCAS instructed them to climb, while at about the same time the TCAS on Flight 611 instructed the crew of that aircraft to descend. Had both aircraft followed those automated instructions, the collision would not have occurred.

Flight 611's pilots followed their TCAS instructions and initiated a descent, but could not immediately inform Nielsen because the controller was dealing with Flight 2937. The crew of Flight 2937, already descending as instructed by Nielsen, disregarded their TCAS instruction to climb. Thus, both planes were now descending.

Unaware of the TCAS-issued alerts, Nielsen repeated his instruction to Flight 2937 to descend, giving the crew incorrect information as to the position of the DHL plane (telling them that the plane was to the right when it was in fact to the left).

Flight 611, responding to the developing situation, increased its descent rate. Eight seconds before the collision, Flight 2937's crew became aware of the situation when they gained visual sight of Flight 611 incoming from the left, and, two seconds before the collision, obeyed their TCAS instruction and attempted to put the aircraft into a climb.

By then the collision was inevitable. Flight 2937 broke into several pieces, scattering wreckage into the Brachenreute neighborhood over a wide area. The nose section of the aircraft fell vertically, while the tail section with the engines continued, stalled, and fell.

Flight 611, now with 80% of its vertical stabilizer lost, struggled for a further  before crashing into a wooded area close to the village of Taisersdorf at a 70° downward angle. Each engine ended up several hundred meters away from the main wreckage, and the tail section was torn from the fuselage by trees just before impact. All 69 people onboard Flight 2937 and both crew members on board Flight 611 died.

Other factors in the crash
Only one ATC, Peter Nielsen of ACC Zurich, was controlling the airspace through which the aircraft were flying. The other controller on duty was resting in another room for the night. This was against Skyguide's regulations, but had been a common practice for years and was known and tolerated by management. Maintenance work was being carried out on the main radar image processing system, which meant that the controllers were forced to use a fallback system.

The ground-based optical collision warning system, which would have alerted the controller to the pending collision about  minutes before it happened, had been switched off for maintenance. Nielsen was unaware of this. An aural short-term conflict alert warning system released a warning addressed to workstation RE SUED at 23:35:00 (32 seconds before the collision). This warning was not heard by anyone present at that time, although no error in this system could be found in a subsequent technical audit;  however, whether or not this audible warning is functional is not something that is technically logged. Even if Nielsen had heard this warning, at that time finding a useful resolution order by the ATC was impossible.

Deviating statements in the official report

All countries involved could add additional "deviating" statements to the official report. Bahrain, Switzerland, and Russia did submit positions that were published with the official report. The deviating statements were published verbatim as an appendix to the report by the BFU investigators.

The statement by Bahrain, the home country of the DHL plane, mostly agrees with the findings of the report. It says that the report should have put less emphasis on the actions of individuals and more on the faults within Skyguide's organisation and management. Bahrain's statement also mentions the lack of crew resource management in the Tupolev's cockpit as a factor in the crash.

Also, the ATC gave the wrong position of the DHL plane (2 o'clock instead of the actual 10 o'clock). Russia asserts that the DHL crew had a "real possibility" to avoid a collision, since they were able to hear the conversation between the Russian crew and the controller.

The Swiss say that this was also a cause of the accident. Switzerland also requested that the BFU make a formal finding that the TCAS advisories would have been useful if obeyed immediately; the BFU declined to do so.

Aftermath 

Nielsen needed medical attention due to traumatic stress caused by the accident. At Skyguide, his former colleagues maintained a vase with a white rose over Nielsen's former workstation. Skyguide, after initially having blamed the Russian pilot for the accident, accepted full responsibility and asked relatives of the victims for forgiveness.

Skyguide paid compensation to the families of the dead children; the compensation amount was about CHF 30,000 ($34,087) to CHF 36,000. The Swiss Federal Court turned down appeals from some relatives for higher compensation in 2011.

On 27 July 2006, a court in Konstanz decided that Germany should pay compensation to Bashkirian Airlines. The court found that Germany was legally responsible for the actions of Skyguide. The government appealed the ruling, but in late 2013, Bashkirian Airlines and Germany reached a tacit agreement, ending the court case before a decision on the legal issues was reached.

In another case before the court in Konstanz, Skyguide's liability insurance is suing Bashkirian Airlines for 2.5 million euro in damages. The case was opened in March 2008; the legal questions are expected to be difficult, as the airline has filed for bankruptcy under Russian law.

A criminal investigation of Skyguide began in May 2004. On 7 August 2006, a Swiss prosecutor filed manslaughter charges against eight employees of Skyguide. The prosecutor called for prison terms up to 15 months if found guilty. The verdict was announced in September 2007. Three of the four managers convicted were given suspended prison terms and the fourth was ordered to pay a fine. Another four Skyguide employees were cleared of any wrongdoing.

Murder of Peter Nielsen 
Devastated by the death of his wife and two children aboard flight 2937, Vitaly Kaloyev, a Russian architect, held Peter Nielsen personally responsible for their deaths. He tracked down and stabbed Nielsen to death, in the presence of Nielsen's wife and three children, at his home in Kloten, near Zürich, on 24 February 2004. The Swiss police arrested Kaloyev at a local motel shortly afterward, and in 2005, he was sentenced to eight years for manslaughter. However, his sentence was later reduced after a Swiss judge ruled that he had acted with diminished responsibility.

He was released in November 2007, having spent less than four years in prison, because his mental condition was not sufficiently considered in the initial sentence. In January 2008, he was appointed deputy construction minister of North Ossetia. Kaloyev was treated as a hero back home, and expressed no regret for his actions, instead blaming the murder victim for his own death. In 2016, Kaloyev was awarded the highest state medal by the government, the medal "To the Glory of Ossetia". The medal is awarded for the highest achievements, improving the living conditions of the inhabitants of the region,  educating the younger generation, and maintaining law and order.

TCAS and conflicting orders
The accident raised questions as to how pilots must react when they receive conflicting orders from TCAS and ATC. TCAS was a relatively new technology at the time of the accident, having been mandatory in Europe since 2000. When TCAS issues a resolution advisory (RA), the pilot flying should respond immediately by directing attention to RA displays and maneuvering as indicated, unless doing so would jeopardise the safe operation of the flight, or unless the flight crew can assure separation with the help of definitive visual acquisition of the aircraft causing the RA.

In responding to a TCAS RA that directs a deviation from assigned altitude, the flight crew should communicate with ATC as soon as practicable after responding to the RA. When the RA is removed, the flight crew should advise ATC that they are returning to their previously assigned clearance or should acknowledge any amended clearance issued.

While TCAS is programmed to assume that both crews will promptly follow the system's instructions, the operations manual did not clearly state that TCAS should always take precedence over any ATC commands. The manual described TCAS as "a backup to the ATC system", which could be wrongly interpreted to mean that ATC instructions have higher priority. This ambiguity was replicated in the Tu-154 Flight Operations Manual, which contained contradictory sections. On the one hand, chapter 8.18.3.4 emphasised the role of ATC and describes TCAS as an "additional aid", while chapter 8.18.3.2 forbade manoeuvers contrary to TCAS. The BFU recommended that this ambiguity should be resolved in favor of obeying TCAS advisories even when these were in conflict with ATC instructions.

Prior incident

About 17 months before the Bashkirian Airlines-DHL collision, another incident had occurred involving confusion between conflicting TCAS and ATC commands. In 2001, two Japanese airliners nearly collided with each other in Japanese airspace. One of the aircraft had received conflicting orders from TCAS and ATC; one pilot followed the instructions of TCAS, while the other did not. A collision was only averted because one of the pilots made evasive maneuvers based on a visual judgment. In its report, published 11 days after the Überlingen accident, Japan called on the International Civil Aviation Organization (ICAO) to make it clear that TCAS advisories should always take precedence over ATC instructions. ICAO accepted this recommendation and amended its regulations in November 2003.

Technical solutions
Before this accident, a change proposal (CP 112) for the TCAS II system had been issued. This proposal would have created a "reversal" of the original warning – asking the DHL plane to climb and the Tupolev crew to descend. According to an analysis by Eurocontrol, this would have avoided the collision if the DHL crew had received and followed the new instructions and the Tupolev had continued to descend. All TCAS II equipped aircraft have been upgraded to support RA reversal.

Additionally, an automatic downlink for TCAS, which would have alerted the controller that a TCAS advisory had been issued to the aircraft under his control, and notified him of the nature of that advisory, had not been deployed worldwide at the time of the accident.

Recommendations after the accident
The investigation report contains a number of recommendations concerning TCAS, calling for upgrades and for better training and clearer instructions to the pilots. The TCAS II system was redesigned, with its ambiguous "Adjust Vertical Speed" RA voice command changed to "Level-Off", to increase proper responses from pilots.

In media
Films
The crash and the subsequent killing of the ATC were used as the basis of a motion picture produced by German and Swiss TV stations SWR and SF, called Flug in die Nacht – Das Unglück von Überlingen (Flight into the Night – the Accident at Überlingen) (2009), starring Ken Duken as Nielsen and Evgeni Sitochin as Kaloyev.
The U.S. film Aftermath (2017) is loosely based on the Überlingen midair collision, starring Arnold Schwarzenegger as a character largely based on Kaloyev.
 The Russian film Unforgiven (2018) is based on the Überlingen midair collision, with Dmitry Nagiyev portraying Kaloyev.

Music
 "Ballad of Vitaly", the closing track on the U.S. rock band Delta Spirit's album History from Below (2010), recounts the story of the midair collision and Vitaly Kaloyev's actions following the crash.
 The German futurepop band Edge of Dawn alludes to Kaloyev's story and mentions his name in the song "The Flight (Lux)", which appears on their EP The Flight (2005) and their full-length album Enjoy the Fall (2007).

Podcasts
 On 3 and 10 February 2019, Casefile True Crime Podcast: "Peter Nielsen", Case 106 (Parts 1 and 2) covered the story of the mid-air collision and subsequent killing of the former Skyguide controller Peter Nielsen, by  Russian architect Vitaly Kaloyev.
 On 12 January 2021, the Hard Landings podcast covered the story in Episode 64: The Überlingen Mid-air Collision.
 On 5 May 2022, the Rooster Teeth Black Box Down podcast covered the story in Episode Season 3, episode 17: Accident Ends in Murder / Accident Ends in Murder / The Überlingen Mid-air Collision 

Television
 The collision featured in multiple segments of the Canadian TV series Mayday:
"Deadly Crossroads", a season-two (2004) (called Air Emergency and Air Disasters in the U.S. and Air Crash Investigation in the UK and elsewhere around the world). The dramatisation was broadcast in the United States with the title "A Father's Revenge"; and with the title "Mid-Air Collision" in the United Kingdom, Australia, and Asia. Kaloyev was played by actor Kresimir Bosiljevac, while Nielsen was played by actor Stephen Sparks.
The flight was also included in a Mayday season-eight (2009) Science of Disaster special titled "System Breakdown", which looked at the role of air traffic controllers in aviation disasters.
The National Geographic Channel documentary series Seconds From Disaster featured this midair collision in the episode entitled "Collision at 35,000 feet", released on 26 September 2011.
The episode is dramatized in the episode "Fatal Flaws" of Why Planes Crash.

Theatre
In the U.S. off-Broadway play My Eyes Went Dark, which opened 7 June 2017 and closed 2 July, playwright and director Matthew Wilkinson tells Kaloyev's story, which featured, among other characters, Declan Conlon as Kaloyev and Thusitha Jayasundera as his wife. It played at 59E59 Theaters in New York City.

See also
 List of notable civilian mid-air collisions

Notes

References

Official report

External links

 Final Report  – German Federal Bureau of Aircraft Accidents Investigation (English)
Appendices 1 and 3 (Archive)
 Appendices 2 and 4–10 (Archive)
 Final Report – German Federal Bureau of Aircraft Accidents Investigation  – The German version is the version of record.
 Appendices 1 and 3 
 Appendix 2 
 "Information regarding the air accident at Überlingen on 1 July 2002." Skyguide.
 Davies, Barbara. "THE LOST CHILDREN; EXCLUSIVE Plane crash that robbed a Russian city of its youth." The Daily Mirror. 13 July 2002. – Includes partial victim list
 District Court of Konstanz Bashkirian Airlines v. Federal Republic of Germany 
 Photo documentary from Owingen Fire Dept. (German) – Official website from Owingen Fire Dept. with photos from a firefighter's perspective
 Identifying the factors that contributed to the Ueberlingen mid-air collision (PDF 322 KB) – University of Illinois
 Gallery of crash victim Kyrill Degtyarev's works
 'The Uberlingen mid-air collision: Lessons for the management of control rooms in the process industries', Loss Prevention Bulletin issue 196, 2007, IChemE, UK.
 'Work Practice Simulation of Complex Human-Automation Systems: The Brahms Generalized Überlingen Model'

On conflicting orders 
 ACAS II bulletin from Eurocontrol: Follow the RA!(PDF) 
 ACAS guiding material: CAP 579 (PDF)
 Script for Case Study – Mid Air Collision over Ueberlingen

2002 in Germany
2002 in Russia
Aviation accidents and incidents caused by air traffic controller error
Aviation accidents and incidents in 2002
Aviation accidents and incidents in Germany
Germany–Russia relations
DHL
Accidents and incidents involving the Tupolev Tu-154
Accidents and incidents involving the Boeing 757
Accidents and incidents involving cargo aircraft
Mid-air collisions
Mid-air collisions involving airliners
UNESCO
2000s in Baden-Württemberg
July 2002 events in Europe